Bishop Yeddu Muthyalu (Yeddy Muthyalu) (died 1954) was the first Bishop - in - Krishna-Godavari Diocese of the Church of South India who was consecrated in 1947 at the St. George's Cathedral, Chennai along with thirteen other Bishops.

Anglican Diocese of Dornakal
After initial studies at the Dornakal Divinity School, Muthyalu was ordained in 1924 and became a Priest of the Diocese of Dornakal whose geographical precincts were wide.  In 1929, Muthyalu had a short stint as Tutor at his alma mater after which he again took up the role as Priest.  In 1940, Muthyalu became Honorary Canon of the Epiphany Cathedral in Dornakal a position which he held until 1945 when he was consecrated as Assistant Bishop in Dornakal.

CSI Diocese of Krishna-Godavari
When the Church of South India was formed in 1947, the Diocese of Dornakal was considerably reduced as three new diocese were erected - the Dioceses of Nandyal, Krishna-Godavari, and Rayalaseema.  The Church of South India Synod consecrated Muthyalu in 1947 at St. George's Cathedral, Chennai as the first Bishop - in - Krishna Godavari.  Muthyalu occupied the Cathedra in Eluru.

Death
In 1954, when Muthyalu died suddenly, the Church of South India Synod confabulated and sent A. B. Elliott of the adjoining Diocese of Dornakal to succeed Muthyalu.

Rajaiah David Paul who authored The First Decade: An Account of the Church of South India wrote the following lines about the early life of Yeddu Muthyalu,

References

Telugu people
20th-century Anglican bishops in India
Anglican bishops of Krishna-Godavari
Indian Christian theologians
People from Krishna district
People from Khammam district
1924 births
1954 deaths